George and Adele Jaworowski House, also known as Early Birds, is a historic home located in Michigan Township, LaPorte County, Indiana.  It was designed by architect John Lloyd Wright and built in 1945–1946.  The house is atop and carved into a sand dune on the shore of Lake Michigan.  The house is in the Prairie School of architecture and has a high pitched hipped roof with wide overhanging eaves and dormer. Also contributing is the house site.

It was listed on the National Register of Historic Places in 2013.

References

Houses on the National Register of Historic Places in Indiana
Prairie School architecture in Indiana
Houses completed in 1946
Houses in LaPorte County, Indiana
National Register of Historic Places in LaPorte County, Indiana